The Greater German Reich and the Jews: Nazi Persecution Policies in the Annexed Territories 1935–1945 is a book about the Holocaust in areas annexed by Nazi Germany. The book's chapters are arranged in chronological order by annexation date and cover the Saarland, Austria, the Sudetenland, Protectorate of Bohemia and Moravia, Memel Territory, Danzig and West Prussia, the Warthegau, Zichenau, East Upper Silesia, Eupen-Malmedy, Luxembourg, and Alsace-Lorraine. It was first published in German in 2010; an English translation was published in 2015. The book was edited by Jörg Osterloh and Wolf Gruner. The book received generally favorable reviews.

See also
The Holocaust in the Sudetenland
The Holocaust in Bohemia and Moravia
The Holocaust in East Upper Silesia

References

2010 non-fiction books
2015 non-fiction books
History books about the Holocaust
Edited volumes